Law of retribution may refer to:
 Eye for an eye, in Abrahamic traditions
 Karma, in Indian religions